The Forestville Line, designated as Route K12, is a daily bus route operated by the Washington Metropolitan Area Transit Authority between Suitland station and Branch Avenue station of the Green Line of the Washington Metro. The line operates every 15 – 45 minutes during weekdays and 60 minutes during weekends. Trips are roughly 30 – 40 minutes long. There are a few early morning/late night and rush hour trips that only operate between the Suitland Metro Station & Penn Mar Shopping Center.

Background
Route K12 operates between Branch Avenue and Suitland Stations via Penn Mar Shopping Center. Some trips are shortened to operate between Penn Mar and Suitland. Route K12 operates out of Andrews Federal Center garage since 2019. Prior to moving to Andrews, K12 operated from Southern Avenue until 1989 when it was moved to Landover division.

K12 Stops

History

Initial Background
K12 & K19 were initially created as new bus routes in 1963, to operate between Federal Triangle in Downtown Washington D.C. & Andrews Air Force Base Gates in Camp Springs, MD, via 11th Street NW, E Street NW, 10th Street NW, Pennsylvania Avenue NW, 7th Street SW, Independence Avenue SW/SE, Pennsylvania Avenue SE, Pennsylvania Avenue, Shadyside Avenue, Suitland Road, Silver Hill Road, Pennsylvania Avenue, Parkland Drive, Surrey Service Drive, the Park Berkshire Apartment Complex, Hil Mar Drive, Walters Lane, Forestville Road, and Allentown Road. Both routes eventually became WMATA Metrobus Routes on February 4, 1973 when WMATA acquired all four private bus companies that were operating throughout the Washington D.C. Metropolitan Area and merged them all together to form its own, "Metrobus" System.

Both routes were rerouted to serve Potomac Avenue & Eastern Market stations in the middle of their routes on July 15, 1977.

1978 Service Changes
On September 25, 1978, both routes K12 & K19 were truncated to Potomac Avenue station only eliminating service to Downtown DC.

2001 Service Changes
On January 13, 2001 when the Green Line was extended to Branch Avenue and both the Suitland and Branch Avenue stations opened, route K19 was eliminated K12 was truncated even further, to only operate between Suitland and Branch Avenue stations, via Andrews Air Force Base.

A new route K11 replaced the segment of the former route K12 & K19's routing between Potomac Avenue Metro Station and the intersection of Suitland Road & Silver Hill Road operating parallel to route K12. Unlike route K12, route K11 would not serve Suitland station and operated during times the Green Line is not operating. 

Another new route, the K13 was also introduced to operate on select rush hour trips between Suitland Metro Station & Penn Mar Shopping Center.

2004 Service Changes
Due to the planned closure by the management of the Park Berkshire Apartments roadway that connects with Hil Mar Drive on June 27, 2004, routes K11, K12 & K13 were rerouted to operate to Suitland station, via their regular routing between the intersection of Walters Lane & Pennsylvania Avenue and intersection Hil Mar Drive & Park Berkshire roadway. All K11 & K12 trips to the Branch Avenue station as well as the K13 routes were also rerouted to follow the exact same routing, except in the exact opposite direction.

2016 Service Changes
On June 26, 2016, route K11 was discontinued and replaced by K12. This and the J11 were the last one morning trips that operate prior to Metro opening heading to Potomac Avenue station.

2018 Service Changes
On June 24, 2018, route K13 was discontinued and replaced by Route K12. Route K13 shortened trips between Suitland Metro Station & Penn Mar Shopping Center, were replaced by rush hour K12 trips as of a result. Route K12 was also rerouted to operate via Donnell Drive, Marlboro Pike, and Forestville Road between Pennsylvania Avenue & Donnell Drive and Pennsylvania Avenue & Forestville Road but no longer stop on Command Drive at Allentown Road (Joint Base Andrews West Gate).

References

K12